Trinity Memorial Episcopal Church may refer to:
Trinity Memorial Episcopal Church (Mapleton, Iowa)
Trinity Memorial Episcopal Church (Crete, Nebraska), a National Register of Historic Places listing in Saline County, Nebraska

See also
Trinity Episcopal Church (disambiguation)